Rene Smith may refer to:

Rene Smith, character in Heavens Above!
Rene Smith, Miss Tennessee USA
Bean,  Beanie, Beaner, Rener, Racecar ReneR, Rowan Atkinson, Pin Stripe, Stripes, Beanie Pie, Rener & a Beaner & a 3 Bags Full, Reen, The Indomitable Bean, Reena-Warrior Prince

See also
Heather Rene Smith
Irene Smith (disambiguation)
Renée Felice Smith (born 1985), American actress